A Little Fellow from Gambo: The Joey Smallwood Story is a Canadian documentary film, directed by Julian Biggs and released by the National Film Board of Canada in 1970. The film is a portrait of Joey Smallwood, the controversial but powerful Newfoundland and Labrador politician who was known as the "last living Father of Confederation" for his role in negotiating the admission of Newfoundland and Labrador as a Canadian province in 1949.

The film won three Canadian Film Awards at the 22nd Canadian Film Awards in 1970, for Best Public Affairs Film, Best Direction in a Non-Feature (Biggs) and Best Actor in a Non-Feature (Smallwood). The choice of Smallwood, who was simply being himself in a documentary film, as the recipient of an acting award was justified by the award organizers on the grounds that Smallwood's flamboyant and charismatic personality made him a "distinguished natural actor". It was subsequently screened at the 1971 Stratford Film Festival.

References

External links

1970 films
1970 documentary films
Canadian documentary films
Documentary films about Canadian politicians
National Film Board of Canada documentaries
Films shot in Newfoundland and Labrador
1970s English-language films
Films set in Newfoundland and Labrador
Films about politicians
Documentary films about politicians
English-language Canadian films
Quebec films
1970s Canadian films